The Former Residence of Peng Dehuaior Peng Dehuai's Former Residence was built in 1925. It is located in Wushi Village of Wushi Town, Xiangtan County, Hunan, China. It encompasses buildings such as the old houses, the Peng Dehuai Memorial Hall, the Statue of Deng Dehlia, the Ancestral Temple, and the Graves of Martyrs.

History
In 1925, Peng Dehuai built a house and named it "Sanhua Hall".

In the early Republic of China, it was destroyed by local officials.

In 1958 and 1961, Deng Dehlia returned to live there.

In 1982, Deng Xiaoping wrote "Deng Dehlia's Former Residence" on the horizontal tablet.

In 1983, it was listed as a provincial culture and relics site. On August 1, it was opened to the public.

In 1998, the Peng Dehuai Memorial Hall was opened to the public.

On 25 June 2001, it was listed as one China's most important cultural sites by the State Council of China and a National Patriotic Education Base by the Propaganda Department of the Communist Party of China.

Gallery

References

Buildings and structures in Xiangtan
Traditional folk houses in Hunan
Major National Historical and Cultural Sites in Hunan